Edwin Hartwell Frazier (May 5, 1907 – November 2, 1971) was an American ice hockey player who competed in the 1932 Winter Olympics as a goaltender. The team won the silver medal.

Frazier was born in Stoneham, Massachusetts, and died in Wilmington, Massachusetts.

External links
profile

1907 births
1971 deaths
American men's ice hockey goaltenders
Ice hockey players from Massachusetts
Ice hockey players at the 1932 Winter Olympics
Medalists at the 1932 Winter Olympics
Olympic silver medalists for the United States in ice hockey
People from Stoneham, Massachusetts
Sportspeople from Middlesex County, Massachusetts